Gerry Talaoc is a Filipino comics artist best known for his 1970s work for DC Comics' war and horror anthology titles.

Biography
Gerry Talaoc was among the vanguard of Filipino comics artists — including Alfredo Alcala, Nestor Redondo, Steve Gan, Ernie Chan and Alex Niño — recruited in 1971 for American comic books by DC editor Joe Orlando and publisher Carmine Infantino, following the success of the pioneering Tony DeZuniga. Initially working through countryman DeZuniga's studio, Talaoc's first published work in the United States was the story "Phony Face" in House of Mystery #205 (Aug. 1972). He drew multiple issues of Ghosts, House of Mystery, Star Spangled War Stories, The Unexpected, and Weird War Tales, among other titles. Talaoc's art was celebrated for its distinctive mix of the real and the cartoony, a style pioneered by such Golden Age cartoonists as Milton Caniff and Chester Gould.

In the mid–1970s, Talaoc also worked on comics adaptations of literary classics published by Pendulum Press.

In 1984, Talaoc moved to Marvel Comics, where he worked primarily as an inker. His first work there was on The Incredible Hulk #291 (Jan. 1984) paired with Sal Buscema. Other Marvel work included Alpha Flight and the Comet Man limited series inking over Kelley Jones' pencils. Talaoc retired from the American comics business in the early 1990s. During his career, Talaoc worked exclusively in the Philippines, although he now lives in the United States.

Bibliography

DC Comics

 Elvira's House of Mystery #11 (1987)
 Forbidden Tales of Dark Mansion #15 (1974)
 Ghosts #10, 13–14, 16–18, 23, 27, 31, 87 (1972–1980)
 G.I. Combat #226, 233, 238, 245, 249, 251, 253, 264, 271, 275 (1981–1985)
 House of Mystery #205, 210–211, 215, 217–218, 224, 226, 228, 231, 282, 303, 315 (1972–1983)
 House of Secrets #105, 108, 110–111, 114, 121, 131, 150 (1973–1978)
 Limited Collectors' Edition #C–32 (1974)
 Phantom Stranger vol. 2 #27–31, 34–37 (1973–1975)
 Secrets of Haunted House #6 (1977)
 Secrets of Sinister House #10 (1973)
 Star Spangled War Stories #183–204 (Unknown Soldier) (1974–1977)
 Tarzan Family #66 (1976)
 The Unexpected #141, 150, 154, 156, 161, 165, 168, 176, 183, 188, 191, 198 (1972–1980)
 Unknown Soldier #205–210, 212–213, 215, 217–218, 220–222, 225–234, 236–268 (1977–1982)
 Weird War Tales #9, 11–12, 15, 18–19, 29–30, 32, 57, 68, 76, 81, 104, 106, 109 (1972–1982)
 The Witching Hour #25, 27–28, 63, 75, 79 (1972–1978)
 Young Romance #194 (1973)

Marvel Comics

 Alpha Flight #29–38, 66–67, 72, Annual #1 (1985–1989)
 Amazing High Adventure #1–2 (1984–1985)
 Animax #1–4 (1986–1987)
 Clive Barker's Hellraiser Summer Special #1 (1992)
 Comet Man #1–6 (1987)
 Conan the Barbarian #248 (1991)
 Daredevil #219 (1985)
 The Incredible Hulk vol. 2 #291, 293–294, 296–309, 311–313, Annual #13 (1984–1985)
 Kickers, Inc. #11 (1987)
 Marvel Comics Presents #47, 50–52 (1990)
 Power Pack #40 (1988)
 The Punisher vol. 2 #20 (1989)
 Rawhide Kid vol. 2 #2–3 (1985)
 Savage Sword of Conan #183 (1991)
 Strange Tales vol. 2 #7 (Cloak and Dagger) (1987)
 West Coast Avengers Annual #3 (1988)

References

External links
 
 

20th-century Filipino artists
21st-century Filipino artists
Comics inkers
Filipino comics artists
Filipino emigrants to the United States
Living people
Year of birth missing (living people)